Saint Anthony, Antony, or Antonius, most often refers to Anthony of Padua, otherwise known as Saint Anthony of Lisbon, is the patron saint of lost things in Christianity. This name may also refer to:

People
Anthony of Antioch (266–302), Martyr under Diocletian. Feast day: January 9.
Anthony the Great (251–356), Egyptian Christian saint and Desert Father. Feast day: January 17 or 30.
Anthony of Padua (1195–1231), Doctor of the Church, also known as Saint Anthony of Lisbon. Feast day: June 13.
Anthony the Hermit (c. 468 – c. 520), also known as Antony of Lérins. Feast day: December 28.
Antony the Younger (785–865), Byzantine monk. Feast day: December 1.
Anthony of Kiev (983–1073), also known as Anthony of the Caves. Feast day: July 23.
Anthony of Rome (died 1147), also known as Antony Rimlyanin. Feast day: January 17 and August 3.
Antoninus of Florence (1389–1459), also known as Anthony of Florence. Feast day: May 10.
Anthony of Siya (1479–1556), founder of the Antonievo-Siysky Monastery. Feast day: December 7.
Anthony of St. Ann Galvão (1739–1822), also known as Frei Galvão. Feast day: May 11.
Anthony Mary Claret (1807–1870), founder of the Missionary Sons of the Immaculate Heart of Mary. Feast Day: October 24.

Orders
Hospital Brothers of St. Anthony, a religious medical order founded about 1095
Order of Saint Anthony (Bavaria), a Bavarian military order founded in 1382
Order of Saint Anthony (Ethiopia), an Ethiopian religious order founded in 370
St. Anthony Hall (a.k.a. the Order of St. Anthony), a U.S. college literary society

Places

Canada
 St. Anthony, Newfoundland and Labrador

England
St Anthony-in-Meneage, Cornwall
St Anthony in Roseland, Cornwall
St Anthony Head, Roseland Peninsula, Cornwall

Spain
 Sant Antoni de Calonge, part of the city of Calonge, Catalonia, Spain.

United States
St. Anthony, Idaho
Saint Anthony, Indiana
St. Anthony, Iowa
St. Anthony, New Orleans, Louisiana
 St. Anthony, former twin city of Minneapolis; see History of Minneapolis
St. Anthony, Minnesota, in Hennepin County
St. Anthony, Stearns County, Minnesota
Saint Anthony, Missouri
Saint Anthony, North Dakota
San Antonio, Texas
Saint Anthony, Wisconsin
Saint Anthony Falls in Minneapolis, Minnesota, highest waterfall on the Mississippi River

Caribbean region
Saint Anthony Parish, Montserrat

Africa
San Antonio de Palé on Annobón, particularly in reference to the British fort there in the 19th century

Other 
St. Anthony College, Roxas City, Capiz, Philippines
St. Anthony Dining Room, a charitable organization in San Francisco, California that provides meals to the homeless
St Anthony (ship), wrecked in 1527

See also
Anthony (disambiguation)
Antony (disambiguation)
St. Anthony Church (disambiguation)
St. Anthony Hospital (disambiguation)
St Anthony's College (disambiguation)
St. Anthony's Cross
Saint Anthony's fire (disambiguation)
St Anthony's F.C., a football club in Scotland
St Anthony's Girls' Catholic Academy, a secondary school in Sunderland, England
St Anthony's Hall, a building in York, England
St. Anthony's Hospital (disambiguation)
St. Anthony's School (disambiguation)
 Weingut St. Antony in Nierstein

Saint Anthony in 
San Antonio (disambiguation)
Sant'Antonio (disambiguation)
Santo Antônio de Lisboa (disambiguation)
Sankt Anton (disambiguation)